Wierzynek is a restaurant located at the Main Square of Kraków Old Town. It occupies four floors and has a capacity of 200 guests.  There are eight separate dining rooms including the Italian Pompeii Rooms, the Tatra Room, The Clock Room, the Knights Room and the Chamber of Imagination.

Many world leaders and celebrities have visited the restaurant including Charles de Gaulle, Fidel Castro, Sophie Marceau and Kate Moss.

See also 
 Antoni Hawełka
 Café Noworolski

References

External links 
 Homepage of Wierzynek
 Restauracja Wierzynek - Restaurant Wierzynek na stronie polska-org.pl 

Buildings and structures in Kraków
Tourist attractions in Kraków
Restaurants in Poland
Polish restaurants
Polish brands